A list of Bangladeshi films released in 1996.

Releases

See also

1996 in Bangladesh

References

Film
Lists of 1996 films by country or language
 1996